Please don't delete this article because this actor or actress is new and will play/is playing a lead, supporting or breakthrough role in the tokusatsu series "Kaitou Sentai Lupinranger VS Keisatsu Sentai Patranger" and will continue their career and make more roles, either lead or supporting, after the end of the programme.

 is a Japanese actor. He is represented with A-team.

Appearances

TV dramas

My High School Business (NTV, 2017), Year 3 Class 3 student, Kohei Aoyagi
Kaitou Sentai Lupinranger VS Keisatsu Sentai Patranger (TV Asahi, 2018), Sakuya Hikawa/Patren 2gou 
Sign (TV Asahi, 2019), Eiji Kitami
Nippon Noir: Detective Y's rebellion (NTV, 2019), Takashi Mazezono (Detective)
Wasteful Days of High School Girls (TV Asahi, 2020), Officer Police

Films
Lesson of the Evil (10 Nov 2012, Toho) – as Daisuke Shiomi
Kaitou Sentai Lupinranger VS Keisatsu Sentai Patranger en Film (4 Aug 2018) as Hikawa Sakuya/Patren 
Lupinranger VS Patranger VS Kyuranger (3 May 2019) as Hikawa Sakuya/Patren
Kishiryu Sentai Ryusoulger VS Lupinranger VS Patranger the Movie (2020) (8 Feb 2020) as Hikawa Sakuya/Patren

Stage
Picture × Read Aloud Sakura Yuki –Aru Yuki Onna no Monogatari–
Tacphes Special Performance What a wonderful life!

References

External links
 

1995 births
Living people
Male actors from Tokyo